Atheism, in the broadest sense, is an absence of belief in the existence of deities. Less broadly, atheism is a rejection of the belief that any deities exist. In an even narrower sense, atheism is specifically the position that there  no deities. Atheism is contrasted with theism, which in its most general form is the belief that at least one deity exists.

The first individuals to identify themselves as atheists lived in the 18th century during the Age of Enlightenment. The French Revolution, noted for its "unprecedented atheism", witnessed the first significant political movement in history to advocate for the supremacy of human reason. In 1967, Albania declared itself the first official atheist country according to its policy of state Marxism.

Arguments for atheism range from philosophical to social and historical approaches. Rationales for not believing in deities include the lack of evidence, the problem of evil, the argument from inconsistent revelations, the rejection of concepts that cannot be falsified, and the argument from nonbelief. Nonbelievers contend that atheism is a more parsimonious position than theism and that everyone is born without beliefs in deities; therefore, they argue that the burden of proof lies not on the atheist to disprove the existence of gods but on the theist to provide a rationale for theism. Although some atheists have adopted secular philosophies (e.g. secular humanism), there is no ideology or code of conduct to which all atheists adhere.

Since conceptions of atheism vary, accurate estimations of current numbers of atheists are difficult. Scholars have indicated that global atheism may be in decline due to irreligious countries having the lowest birth rates in the world and religious countries having higher birth rates in general.

Definitions and types 

Writers disagree on how best to define and classify atheism, contesting what supernatural entities are considered gods, whether atheism is a philosophical position in its own right or merely the absence of one, and whether it requires a conscious, explicit rejection. However the norm is to define atheism in terms of an explicit stance against theism.

Atheism has been regarded as compatible with agnosticism, but has also been contrasted with it.

Range 
Some of the ambiguity and controversy involved in defining atheism arises from difficulty in reaching a consensus for the definitions of words like deity and god. The variety of wildly different conceptions of God and deities lead to differing ideas regarding atheism's applicability. The ancient Romans accused Christians of being atheists for not worshiping the pagan deities. Gradually, this view fell into disfavor as theism came to be understood as encompassing belief in any divinity.

With respect to the range of phenomena being rejected, atheism may counter anything from the existence of a deity, to the existence of any spiritual, supernatural, or transcendental concepts, such as those of Buddhism, Hinduism, Jainism, and Taoism.

Implicit vs. explicit 

Definitions of atheism also vary in the degree of consideration a person must put to the idea of gods to be considered an atheist. Atheism is commonly defined as the simple absence of belief that any deities exist. This broad definition would include newborns and other people who have not been exposed to theistic ideas. As far back as 1772, Baron d'Holbach said that "All children are born Atheists; they have no idea of God."
Similarly, George H. Smith suggested that: "The man who is unacquainted with theism is an atheist because he does not believe in a god. This category would also include the child with the conceptual capacity to grasp the issues involved, but who is still unaware of those issues. The fact that this child does not believe in god qualifies him as an atheist." Implicit atheism is "the absence of theistic belief without a conscious rejection of it" and explicit atheism is the conscious rejection of belief.
For the purposes of his paper on "philosophical atheism", Ernest Nagel contested including the mere absence of theistic belief as a type of atheism. Graham Oppy classifies as innocents those who never considered the question because they lack any understanding of what a god is. According to Oppy, these could be one-month-old babies, humans with severe traumatic brain injuries, or patients with advanced dementia.

Positive vs. negative 

Philosophers such as Antony Flew and Michael Martin have contrasted positive (strong/hard) atheism with negative (weak/soft) atheism. Positive atheism is the explicit affirmation that gods do not exist. Negative atheism includes all other forms of non-theism. According to this categorization, anyone who is not a theist is either a negative or a positive atheist.
The terms weak and strong are relatively recent, while the terms negative and positive atheism are of older origin, having been used (in slightly different ways) in the philosophical literature and in Catholic apologetics.

While Martin, for example, asserts that agnosticism entails negative atheism, many agnostics see their view as distinct from atheism, which they may consider no more justified than theism or requiring an equal conviction.
The assertion of unattainability of knowledge for or against the existence of gods is sometimes seen as an indication that atheism requires a leap of faith.
Common atheist responses to this argument include that unproven religious propositions deserve as much disbelief as all other unproven propositions,
and that the unprovability of a god's existence does not imply an equal probability of either possibility.
Australian philosopher J.J.C. Smart even argues that "sometimes a person who is really an atheist may describe herself, even passionately, as an agnostic because of unreasonable generalized philosophical skepticism which would preclude us from saying that we know anything whatever, except perhaps the truths of mathematics and formal logic."
Consequently, some atheist authors, such as Richard Dawkins, prefer distinguishing theist, agnostic, and atheist positions along a spectrum of theistic probability—the likelihood that each assigns to the statement "God exists".

Definition as impossible or impermanent 
Before the 18th century, the existence of God was so accepted in the Western world that even the possibility of true atheism was questioned. This is called theistic innatism—the notion that all people believe in God from birth; within this view was the connotation that atheists are in denial. There is also a position claiming that atheists are quick to believe in God in times of crisis, that atheists make deathbed conversions, or that "there are no atheists in foxholes". There have, however, been examples to the contrary, among them examples of literal "atheists in foxholes". Some atheists have challenged the need for the term "atheism". In his book Letter to a Christian Nation, Sam Harris wrote:
In fact, "atheism" is a term that should not even exist. No one ever needs to identify himself as a "non-astrologer" or a "non-alchemist". We do not have words for people who doubt that Elvis is still alive or that aliens have traversed the galaxy only to molest ranchers and their cattle. Atheism is nothing more than the noises reasonable people make in the presence of unjustified religious beliefs.

Etymology 

In early ancient Greek, the adjective  (from the privative ἀ- +  "god") meant "godless". It was first used as a term of censure roughly meaning "ungodly" or "impious". In the 5th century BCE, the word began to indicate more deliberate and active godlessness in the sense of "severing relations with the gods" or "denying the gods". The term  then came to be applied against those who impiously denied or disrespected the local gods, even if they believed in other gods. Modern translations of classical texts sometimes render  as "atheistic". As an abstract noun, there was also , "atheism". Cicero transliterated the Greek word into the Latin . The term found frequent use in the debate between early Christians and Hellenists, with each side attributing it, in the pejorative sense, to the other.

The term atheist (from the French ), in the sense of "one who ... denies the existence of God or gods", predates atheism in English, being first found as early as 1566, and again in 1571. Atheist as a label of practical godlessness was used at least as early as 1577.

The term atheism was derived from the French , and appears in English about 1587. An earlier work, from about 1534, used the term atheonism.

Related words emerged later: deist in 1621, theist in 1662, deism in 1675, and theism in 1678.

Deism and theism changed meanings slightly around 1700 due to the influence of atheism; deism was originally used as a synonym for today's theism but came to denote a separate philosophical doctrine.

Karen Armstrong writes that "During the 16th and 17th centuries, the word 'atheist' was still reserved exclusively for polemic ... The term 'atheist' was an insult. Nobody would have dreamed of calling  an atheist."

Atheism was first used to describe a self-avowed belief in late 18th-century Europe, specifically denoting disbelief in the monotheistic Abrahamic god.

In the 20th century, globalization contributed to the expansion of the term to refer to disbelief in all deities, though it remains common in Western society to describe atheism as "disbelief in God".

Arguments

Epistemological arguments 

Skepticism, based on the ideas of David Hume, asserts that certainty about anything is impossible, so one can never know for sure whether or not a god exists. Hume, however, held that such unobservable metaphysical concepts should be rejected as "sophistry and illusion". The allocation of agnosticism to atheism is disputed; it can also be regarded as an independent, basic worldview.

There are three main conditions of epistemology: truth, belief and justification. Michael Martin argues that atheism is a justified and rational true belief, but offers no extended epistemological justification because current theories are in a state of controversy. Martin instead argues for "mid-level principles of justification that are in accord with our ordinary and scientific rational practice."

Other arguments for atheism that can be classified as epistemological or ontological, including ignosticism, assert the meaninglessness or unintelligibility of basic terms such as "God" and statements such as "God is all-powerful." Theological noncognitivism holds that the statement "God exists" does not express a proposition, but is nonsensical or cognitively meaningless. It has been argued both ways as to whether such individuals can be classified into some form of atheism or agnosticism. Philosophers A. J. Ayer and Theodore M. Drange reject both categories, stating that both camps accept "God exists" as a proposition; they instead place noncognitivism in its own category.

Metaphysical arguments 

Philosopher, Zofia Zdybicka writes:

Most atheists lean toward metaphysical monism: the belief that there is only one kind of ultimate substance. Historically, metaphysical monism took the form of philosophical materialism, the view that matter formed the basis of all reality; this naturally omitted the possibility of a non-material divine being. Describing the world as "basically matter" in the twenty-first century would be contrary to modern physics, so it is generally seen as an older term that is sometimes mistakenly used interchangeably with physicalism. Physicalism can incorporate the non-matter based physical phenomena, such as light and energy, into its view that only physical entities with physical powers exist, and that science defines and explains what those are. Physicalism is a monistic ontology: one ultimate substance exists, and it exists as a physical reality.

Physicalism opposes dualism (the view that there's physical substance and separate mental activities): there is no such thing as a soul, or any other abstract object (such as a mind or a self) that exists independently of physicality. It also opposes neutral monism, which holds to one kind of substance for the universe but makes no claim about its nature, holding to the view that the physical and the mental are both just differing kinds of the same fundamental substance that is in itself neither mental nor physical. Physicalism also opposes idealism (the view that everything known is based on human mental perception).

Naturalism is also used by atheists to describe the metaphysical view that everything that exists is fundamentally natural, and that there are no supernatural phenomena. Naturalism focuses on how science can explain the world fully with physical laws and through natural phenomena. It's about the idea that the universe is a closed system. Naturalism can be interpreted to allow for a dualist ontology of the mental and physical. Philosopher Graham Oppy references a PhilPapers survey that says 56.5% of philosophers in academics lean toward physicalism; 49.8% lean toward naturalism.

According to Graham Oppy, direct arguments for atheism aim at showing theism fails on its own terms, while indirect arguments are those inferred from direct arguments in favor of something else that is inconsistent with theism. For example, Oppy says arguing for naturalism is an argument for atheism since naturalism and theism "cannot both be true". Fiona Ellis says that while Oppy's view is common, it is dependent on a narrow view of naturalism. She describes the "expansive naturalism" of John McDowell, James Griffin and David Wiggins as giving "due respect to scientific findings" while also asserting there are things in human experience which cannot be explained in such terms, such as the concept of value, leaving room for theism. Christopher C. Knight asserts a theistic naturalism that relies on what he terms an "incarnational naturalism" (the doctrine of immanence) and does not require any special mode of divine action that would put it outside nature. Nevertheless, Oppy argues that a strong naturalism favors atheism, though he finds the best direct arguments against theism to be the evidential problem of evil, and arguments concerning the contradictory nature of God were He to exist.

Logical arguments 

Some atheists hold the view that the various conceptions of gods, such as the personal god of Christianity, are ascribed logically inconsistent qualities. Such atheists present deductive arguments against the existence of God, which assert the incompatibility between certain traits, such as perfection, creator-status, immutability, omniscience, omnipresence, omnipotence, omnibenevolence, transcendence, personhood (a personal being), non-physicality, justice, and mercy.

Theodicean atheists believe that the world as they experience it cannot be reconciled with the qualities commonly ascribed to God and gods by theologians. They argue that an omniscient, omnipotent, and omnibenevolent God is not compatible with a world where there is evil and suffering, and where divine love is hidden from many people.

A similar argument is attributed to Siddhartha Gautama, the founder of Buddhism. The medieval Buddhist philosopher Vasubandhu (4/5th century) who outlined numerous Buddhist arguments against God, wrote in his Sheath of Abhidharma (Abhidharmakosha):Besides, do you say that God finds joy in seeing the creatures which he has created in the prey of all the distress of existence, including the tortures of the hells? Homage to this kind of God! The profane stanza expresses it well: "One calls him Rudra because he burns, because he is sharp, fierce, redoubtable, an eater of flesh, blood and marrow.

Reductionary accounts of religion 

Philosopher Ludwig Feuerbach
and psychoanalyst Sigmund Freud have argued that God and other religious beliefs are human inventions, created to fulfill various psychological and emotional wants or needs, or a projection mechanism from the 'Id' omnipotence; for Vladimir Lenin, in 'Materialism and Empirio-criticism', against the Russian Machism, the followers of Ernst Mach, Feuerbach was the final argument against belief in a god. This is also a view of many Buddhists. Karl Marx and Friedrich Engels, influenced by the work of Feuerbach, argued that belief in God and religion are social functions, used by those in power to oppress the working class. According to Mikhail Bakunin, "the idea of God implies the abdication of human reason and justice; it is the most decisive negation of human liberty, and necessarily ends in the enslavement of mankind, in theory, and practice." He reversed Voltaire's aphorism that if God did not exist, it would be necessary to invent him, writing instead that "if God really existed, it would be necessary to abolish him."

Atheism, religions and spirituality 

Atheism is not mutually exclusive with respect to some religious and spiritual belief systems, including Hinduism, Jainism, Buddhism, Syntheism, Raëlism, and Neopagan movements
such as Wicca.
Āstika schools in Hinduism hold atheism to be a valid path to moksha, but extremely difficult, for the atheist cannot expect any help from the divine on their journey.
Jainism believes the universe is eternal and has no need for a creator deity, however Tirthankaras are revered beings who can transcend space and time and have more power than the god Indra.
Secular Buddhism does not advocate belief in gods. Early Buddhism was atheistic as Gautama Buddha's path involved no mention of gods. Later conceptions of Buddhism consider Buddha himself a god, suggest adherents can attain godhood, and revere Bodhisattvas.

Atheism and negative theology 

Apophatic theology is often assessed as being a version of atheism or agnosticism, since it cannot say truly that God exists. "The comparison is crude, however, for conventional atheism treats the existence of God as a predicate that can be denied ("God is nonexistent"), whereas negative theology denies that God has predicates". "God or the Divine is" without being able to attribute qualities about "what He is" would be the prerequisite of positive theology in negative theology that distinguishes theism from atheism. "Negative theology is a complement to, not the enemy of, positive theology".

Atheistic philosophies 

Axiological, or constructive, atheism rejects the existence of gods in favor of a "higher absolute", such as humanity. This form of atheism favors humanity as the absolute source of ethics and values, and permits individuals to resolve moral problems without resorting to God. Marx and Freud used this argument to convey messages of liberation, full-development, and unfettered happiness. One of the most common criticisms of atheism has been to the contrary: that denying the existence of a god either leads to moral relativism and leaves one with no moral or ethical foundation, or renders life meaningless and miserable. Blaise Pascal argued this view in his Pensées.

French philosopher Jean-Paul Sartre identified himself as a representative of an "atheist existentialism"
concerned less with denying the existence of God than with establishing that "man needs ... to find himself again and to understand that nothing can save him from himself, not even a valid proof of the existence of God."
Sartre said a corollary of his atheism was that "if God does not exist, there is at least one being in whom existence precedes essence, a being who exists before he can be defined by any concept, and ... this being is man."
Sartre described the practical consequence of this atheism as meaning that there are no a priori rules or absolute values that can be invoked to govern human conduct, and that humans are "condemned" to invent these for themselves, making "man" absolutely "responsible for everything he does".

Religion and morality 

Joseph Baker and Buster Smith assert that one of the common themes of atheism is that most atheists "typically construe atheism as more moral than religion".

Association with world views and social behaviors 
Sociologist Phil Zuckerman analyzed previous social science research on secularity and non-belief and concluded that societal well-being is positively correlated with irreligion. He found that there are much lower concentrations of atheism and secularity in poorer, less developed nations (particularly in Africa and South America) than in the richer industrialized democracies.
His findings relating specifically to atheism in the US were that compared to religious people in the US, "atheists and secular people" are less nationalistic, prejudiced, antisemitic, racist, dogmatic, ethnocentric, closed-minded, and authoritarian, and in US states with the highest percentages of atheists, the murder rate is lower than average. In the most religious states, the murder rate is higher than average.

Irreligion 

People who self-identify as atheists are often assumed to be irreligious, but some sects within major religions reject the existence of a personal, creator deity.
In recent years, certain religious denominations have accumulated a number of openly atheistic followers, such as atheistic or humanistic Judaism
and Christian atheists. The strictest sense of positive atheism does not entail any specific beliefs outside of disbelief in any deity; as such, atheists can hold any number of spiritual beliefs. For the same reason, atheists can hold a wide variety of ethical beliefs, ranging from the moral universalism of humanism, which holds that a moral code should be applied consistently to all humans, to moral nihilism, which holds that morality is meaningless. Atheism is accepted as a valid philosophical position within some varieties of Hinduism, Jainism, and Buddhism. Philosophers such as Alain de Botton and Alexander Bard and Jan Söderqvist, have argued that atheists should reclaim useful components of religion in secular society.

Divine command 
According to Plato's Euthyphro dilemma, the role of the gods in determining right from wrong is either unnecessary or arbitrary. The argument that morality must be derived from God, and cannot exist without a wise creator, has been a persistent feature of political if not so much philosophical debate.
Moral precepts such as "murder is wrong" are seen as divine laws, requiring a divine lawmaker and judge. However, many atheists argue that treating morality legalistically involves a false analogy, and that morality does not depend on a lawmaker in the same way that laws do.
Friedrich Nietzsche believed in a morality independent of theistic belief, and stated that morality based upon God "has truth only if God is truth—it stands or falls with faith in God".

There exist normative ethical systems that do not require principles and rules to be given by a deity. Some include virtue ethics, social contract, Kantian ethics, utilitarianism, and Objectivism. Sam Harris has proposed that moral prescription (ethical rule making) is not just an issue to be explored by philosophy, but that we can meaningfully practice a science of morality. Any such scientific system must, nevertheless, respond to the criticism embodied in the naturalistic fallacy.

Philosophers Susan Neiman
and Julian Baggini
(among others) assert that behaving ethically only because of a divine mandate is not true ethical behavior but merely blind obedience. Baggini argues that atheism is a superior basis for ethics, claiming that a moral basis external to religious imperatives is necessary to evaluate the morality of the imperatives themselves—to be able to discern, for example, that "thou shalt steal" is immoral even if one's religion instructs it—and that atheists, therefore, have the advantage of being more inclined to make such evaluations.
The contemporary British political philosopher Martin Cohen has offered the more historically telling example of Biblical injunctions in favor of torture and slavery as evidence of how religious injunctions follow political and social customs, rather than vice versa, but also noted that the same tendency seems to be true of supposedly dispassionate and objective philosophers. Cohen extends this argument in more detail in Political Philosophy from Plato to Mao, where he argues that the Qur'an played a role in perpetuating social codes from the early 7th century despite changes in secular society.

Criticism of religion 

Some prominent atheists—most recently Christopher Hitchens, Daniel Dennett, Sam Harris, and Richard Dawkins, and following such thinkers as Bertrand Russell, Robert G. Ingersoll, Voltaire, and novelist José Saramago—have criticized religions, citing harmful aspects of religious practices and doctrines.

The 19th-century German political theorist and sociologist Karl Marx called religion "the sigh of the oppressed creature, the heart of a heartless world, and the soul of soulless conditions. It is the opium of the people". He goes on to say, "The abolition of religion as the illusory happiness of the people is the demand for their real happiness. To call on them to give up their illusions about their condition is to call on them to give up a condition that requires illusions. The criticism of religion is, therefore, in embryo, the criticism of that vale of tears of which religion is the halo." Lenin said that "every religious idea and every idea of God is unutterable vileness ... of the most dangerous kind, 'contagion' of the most abominable kind. Millions of sins, filthy deeds, acts of violence and physical contagions ... are far less dangerous than the subtle, spiritual idea of God decked out in the smartest ideological costumes".

Sam Harris criticizes Western religion's reliance on divine authority as lending itself to authoritarianism and dogmatism.
There is a correlation between religious fundamentalism and extrinsic religion (when religion is held because it serves ulterior interests) and authoritarianism, dogmatism, and prejudice.
These arguments—combined with historical events that are argued to demonstrate the dangers of religion, such as the Crusades, inquisitions, witch trials, and terrorist attacks—have been used in response to claims of beneficial effects of belief in religion.
Believers counter-argue that some regimes that espouse atheism, such as the Soviet Union, have also been guilty of mass murder. In response to those claims, atheists such as Sam Harris and Richard Dawkins have stated that Stalin's atrocities were influenced not by atheism but by dogmatic Marxism, and that while Stalin and Mao happened to be atheists, they did not do their deeds in the name of atheism.

History 

While the earliest-found usage of the term atheism is in 16th-century France, ideas that would be recognized today as atheistic are documented from the Vedic period and the classical antiquity.

Early Indian religions 

Atheistic schools are found in early Indian thought and have existed from the times of the historical Vedic religion.
Among the six orthodox schools of Hindu philosophy, Samkhya, the oldest philosophical school of thought, does not accept God, and the early Mimamsa also rejected the notion of God.
The thoroughly materialistic and anti-theistic philosophical Cārvāka (or Lokāyata) school that originated in India around the 6th century BCE is probably the most explicitly atheistic school of philosophy in India, similar to the Greek Cyrenaic school. This branch of Indian philosophy is classified as heterodox due to its rejection of the authority of Vedas and hence is not considered part of the six orthodox schools of Indian philosophy. It is noteworthy as evidence of a materialistic movement in ancient India.
Chatterjee and Datta explain that our understanding of Cārvāka philosophy is fragmentary, based largely on criticism of the ideas by other schools, and that it is not a living tradition:

Other Indian philosophies generally regarded as atheistic include Classical Samkhya and Purva Mimamsa. The rejection of a personal creator "God" is also seen in Jainism and Buddhism in India.

Classical antiquity 

Western atheism has its roots in pre-Socratic Greek philosophy, but atheism in the modern sense was extremely rare in ancient Greece. Pre-Socratic Atomists such as Democritus attempted to explain the world in a purely materialistic way and interpreted religion as a human reaction to natural phenomena, but did not explicitly deny the gods' existence, and some scholarship has recognised a rational theology in his thought. Anaxagoras, whom Irenaeus calls "the atheist", was accused of impiety and condemned for stating that "the sun is a type of incandescent stone", an affirmation with which he tried to deny the divinity of the celestial bodies. In the late fifth century BCE, the Greek lyric poet Diagoras of Melos was sentenced to death in Athens under the charge of being a "godless person" (ἄθεος) after he made fun of the Eleusinian Mysteries, but he fled the city to escape punishment. In post-classical antiquity, philosophers such as Cicero and Sextus Empiricus described Diagoras as an "atheist" who categorically denied the existence of the gods, but in modern scholarship Marek Winiarczyk has defended the view that Diagoras was not an atheist in the modern sense, in a view that has proved influential. On the other hand, the verdict has been challenged by Tim Whitmarsh, who argues that Diagoras rejected the gods on the basis of the problem of evil, and this argument was in turn alluded to in Euripides' fragmentary play Bellerophon.

A fragment from a lost Attic drama that featured Sisyphus, which has been attributed to both Critias and Euripides, claims that a clever man invented "the fear of the gods" in order to frighten people into behaving morally.
Sceptical statements about popular religion have also been attributed to the philosopher Prodicus: Philodemus reports that Prodicus believed that "the gods of popular belief do not exist nor does he know them, but primitive man, [out of admiration, deified] the fruits of the earth and virtually everything that contributed to his existence". More recent scholarship has reappraised the evidence in Philodemus and concluded that Prodicus defended his own philosophical theology against popular religious belief, rather than radical atheism. Protagoras has sometimes been taken to be an atheist, but rather espoused agnostic views, commenting that "Concerning the gods I am unable to discover whether they exist or not, or what they are like in form; for there are many hindrances to knowledge, the obscurity of the subject and the brevity of human life." The Athenian public associated Socrates (–399 BCE) with the trends in pre-Socratic philosophy towards naturalistic inquiry and the rejection of divine explanations for phenomena. Aristophanes' comic play The Clouds (performed 423 BCE) portrays Socrates as teaching his students that the traditional Greek deities do not exist. Socrates was later tried and executed under the charge of not believing in the gods of the state and instead worshipping foreign gods. Socrates himself vehemently denied the charges of atheism at his trial and all the surviving sources about him indicate that he was a very devout man, who prayed to the rising sun and believed that the oracle at Delphi spoke the word of Apollo. From a survey of these 5th-century BCE philosophers, David Sedley has concluded that none of them openly defended radical atheism, but since Classical sources clearly attest to radical atheist ideas Athens probably had an "atheist underground".

Religious scepticism continued into the Hellenistic period, and from this period the most important Greek thinker in the development of atheism was the philosopher Epicurus ( 300 BCE). Drawing on the ideas of Democritus and the Atomists, he espoused a materialistic philosophy according to which the universe was governed by the laws of chance without the need for divine intervention (see scientific determinism). Although Epicurus still maintained that the gods existed, he believed that they were uninterested in human affairs. The aim of the Epicureans was to attain ataraxia ("peace of mind") and one important way of doing this was by exposing fear of divine wrath as irrational. The Epicureans also denied the existence of an afterlife and the need to fear divine punishment after death. A slightly later contemporary to Epicurus, Euhemerus ( 300 BCE) published his view that the gods were only the deified rulers, conquerors and founders of the past, and that their cults and religions were in essence the continuation of vanished kingdoms and earlier political structures. Although not strictly an atheist, Euhemerus was later criticized for having "spread atheism over the whole inhabited earth by obliterating the gods". In the 3rd-century BCE, the Hellenistic philosophers Theodorus Cyrenaicus and Strato of Lampsacus were also reputed to deny the existence of the gods.

Sceptical ideas concerning the gods continued into the Second Sophistic. The Pyrrhonist philosopher Sextus Empiricus (approx. 160-210 CE) compiled a large number of ancient arguments against the existence of gods, recommending that one should suspend judgment regarding the matter. His relatively large volume of surviving works had a lasting influence on later philosophers.

The meaning of "atheist" changed over the course of classical antiquity. Early Christians were widely reviled as "atheists" because they did not believe in the existence of the Graeco-Roman deities. During the Roman Empire, Christians were executed for their rejection of the Roman gods in general and the Imperial cult of ancient Rome in particular. There was, however, a heavy struggle between Christians and pagans, in which each group accused the other of atheism, for not practicing the religion which they considered correct. When Christianity became the state religion of Rome under Theodosius I in 381, heresy became a punishable offense.

Early Middle Ages to the Renaissance 
During the Early Middle Ages, the Islamic world experienced a Golden Age. Along with advances in science and philosophy, Arab and Persian lands produced rationalists and freethinkers who were skeptical about prophecy and revealed religion, such as Muhammad al Warraq (fl. 9th century), Ibn al-Rawandi (827–911), and Abu Bakr al-Razi (–925), as well as outspoken atheists such as al-Maʿarri (973–1058). Al-Ma'arri wrote and taught that religion itself was a "fable invented by the ancients" and that humans were "of two sorts: those with brains, but no religion, and those with religion, but no brains". Despite the fact that these authors were relatively prolific writers, little of their work survives, mainly being preserved through quotations and excerpts in later works by Muslim apologists attempting to refute them.

In Europe, the espousal of atheistic views was rare during the Early Middle Ages and Middle Ages (see Medieval Inquisition); metaphysics and theology were the dominant interests pertaining to religion. There were, however, movements within this period that furthered heterodox conceptions of the Christian god, including differing views of the nature, transcendence, and knowability of God. Individuals and groups such as Johannes Scotus Eriugena, David of Dinant, Amalric of Bena, and the Brethren of the Free Spirit maintained Christian viewpoints with pantheistic tendencies. Nicholas of Cusa held to a form of fideism he called docta ignorantia ("learned ignorance"), asserting that God is beyond human categorization, and thus our knowledge of him is limited to conjecture. William of Ockham inspired anti-metaphysical tendencies with his nominalistic limitation of human knowledge to singular objects, and asserted that the divine essence could not be intuitively or rationally apprehended by human intellect. Followers of Ockham, such as John of Mirecourt and Nicholas of Autrecourt furthered this view. The resulting division between faith and reason influenced later radical and reformist theologians such as John Wycliffe, Jan Hus, and Martin Luther.

The Renaissance did much to expand the scope of free thought and skeptical inquiry. Individuals such as Leonardo da Vinci sought experimentation as a means of explanation, and opposed arguments from religious authority. Other critics of religion and the Church during this time included Niccolò Machiavelli, Bonaventure des Périers, Michel de Montaigne, and François Rabelais.

Early modern period 
Historian Geoffrey Blainey wrote that the Reformation had paved the way for atheists by attacking the authority of the Catholic Church, which in turn "quietly inspired other thinkers to attack the authority of the new Protestant churches". Deism gained influence in France, Prussia, and England. In 1546, French scholar Etienne Dolet was executed upon accusation of being an atheist. The philosopher Baruch Spinoza was "probably the first well known 'semi-atheist' to announce himself in a Christian land in the modern era", according to Blainey. Spinoza believed that natural laws explained the workings of the universe. In 1661, he published his Short Treatise on God.

Criticism of Christianity became increasingly frequent in the 17th and 18th centuries, especially in France and England, where there appears to have been a religious malaise, according to contemporary sources. Some Protestant thinkers, such as Thomas Hobbes, espoused a materialist philosophy and skepticism toward supernatural occurrences, while Spinoza rejected divine providence in favor of a panentheistic naturalism. By the late 17th century, deism came to be openly espoused by intellectuals such as John Toland who coined the term "pantheist".

The first known explicit atheist was the German critic of religion Matthias Knutzen in his three writings of 1674. He was followed by two other explicit atheist writers, the Polish ex-Jesuit philosopher Kazimierz Łyszczyński and in the 1720s by the French priest Jean Meslier. In the course of the 18th century, other openly atheistic thinkers followed, such as Baron d'Holbach, Jacques-André Naigeon, and other French materialists. John Locke in contrast, though an advocate of tolerance, urged authorities not to tolerate atheism, believing that the denial of God's existence would undermine the social order and lead to chaos.

The philosopher David Hume developed a skeptical epistemology grounded in empiricism, and Immanuel Kant's philosophy has strongly questioned the very possibility of metaphysical knowledge. Both philosophers undermined the metaphysical basis of natural theology and criticized classical arguments for the existence of God.

Blainey notes that, although Voltaire is widely considered to have strongly contributed to atheistic thinking during the Revolution, he also considered fear of God to have discouraged further disorder, having said "If God did not exist, it would be necessary to invent him." In Reflections on the Revolution in France (1790), the philosopher Edmund Burke denounced atheism, writing of a "literary cabal" who had "some years ago formed something like a regular plan for the destruction of the Christian religion. This object they pursued with a degree of zeal which hitherto had been discovered only in the propagators of some system of piety ... These atheistical fathers have a bigotry of their own". But, Burke asserted, "man is by his constitution a religious animal" and "atheism is against, not only our reason, but our instincts; and ... it cannot prevail long".

Baron d'Holbach was a prominent figure in the French Enlightenment who is best known for his atheism and for his voluminous writings against religion, the most famous of them being The System of Nature (1770) but also Christianity Unveiled. One goal of the French Revolution was a restructuring and subordination of the clergy with respect to the state through the Civil Constitution of the Clergy. Attempts to enforce it led to anti-clerical violence and the expulsion of many clerics from France, lasting until the Thermidorian Reaction. The radical Jacobins seized power in 1793, ushering in the Reign of Terror. The Jacobins were deists and introduced the Cult of the Supreme Being as a new French state religion. Some atheists surrounding Jacques Hébert instead sought to establish a Cult of Reason, a form of atheistic pseudo-religion with a goddess personifying reason. The Napoleonic era further institutionalized the secularization of French society.

In the latter half of the 19th century, atheism rose to prominence under the influence of rationalistic and freethinking philosophers. Many prominent German philosophers of this era denied the existence of deities and were critical of religion, including Ludwig Feuerbach, Arthur Schopenhauer, Max Stirner, Karl Marx, and Friedrich Nietzsche.

In 1842, George Holyoake was the last person imprisoned in Great Britain due to atheist beliefs. Stephen Law notes that he may have also been the first imprisoned on such a charge. Law states that Holyoake "first coined the term 'secularism'".

Since 1900 

Atheism, particularly in the form of practical atheism, advanced in many societies in the 20th century. Atheistic thought found recognition in a wide variety of other, broader philosophies, such as existentialism, Objectivism, secular humanism, nihilism, anarchism, logical positivism, Marxism, feminism, and the general scientific and rationalist movement.

In addition, state atheism emerged in Eastern Europe and Asia during that period, particularly in the Soviet Union under Vladimir Lenin and Joseph Stalin, and in Communist China under Mao Zedong. Atheist and anti-religious policies in the Soviet Union included numerous legislative acts, the outlawing of religious instruction in the schools, and the emergence of the League of Militant Atheists. After Mao, the Chinese Communist Party remains an atheist organization, and regulates, but does not forbid, the practice of religion in mainland China.

While Geoffrey Blainey has written that "the most ruthless leaders in the Second World War were atheists and secularists who were intensely hostile to both Judaism and Christianity", Richard Madsen has pointed out that Hitler and Stalin each opened and closed churches as a matter of political expedience, and Stalin softened his opposition to Christianity in order to improve public acceptance of his regime during the war. Blackford and Schüklenk have written that "the Soviet Union was undeniably an atheist state, and the same applies to Maoist China and Pol Pot's fanatical Khmer Rouge regime in Cambodia in the 1970s. That does not, however, show that the atrocities committed by these totalitarian dictatorships were the result of atheist beliefs, carried out in the name of atheism, or caused primarily by the atheistic aspects of the relevant forms of communism."

Logical positivism and scientism paved the way for neopositivism, analytical philosophy, structuralism, and naturalism. Neopositivism and analytical philosophy discarded classical rationalism and metaphysics in favor of strict empiricism and epistemological nominalism. Proponents such as Bertrand Russell emphatically rejected belief in God. In his early work, Ludwig Wittgenstein attempted to separate metaphysical and supernatural language from rational discourse. A.J. Ayer asserted the unverifiability and meaninglessness of religious statements, citing his adherence to the empirical sciences. Relatedly the applied structuralism of Lévi-Strauss sourced religious language to the human subconscious in denying its transcendental meaning. J.N. Findlay and J.J.C. Smart argued that the existence of God is not logically necessary. Naturalists and materialistic monists such as John Dewey considered the natural world to be the basis of everything, denying the existence of God or immortality.

Other developments 
Other leaders like Periyar E.V. Ramasamy, a prominent atheist leader of India, fought against Hinduism and Brahmins for discriminating and dividing people in the name of caste and religion. This was highlighted in 1956 when he arranged for the erection of a statue depicting a Hindu god in a humble representation and made antitheistic statements.

Atheist Vashti McCollum was the plaintiff in a landmark 1948 Supreme Court case that struck down religious education in US public schools. Madalyn Murray O'Hair was one of the most influential American atheists; she brought forth the 1963 Supreme Court case Murray v. Curlett which banned compulsory prayer in public schools. In 1966, Time magazine asked "Is God Dead?" in response to the Death of God theological movement, citing the estimation that nearly half of all people in the world lived under an anti-religious power, and millions more in Africa, Asia, and South America seemed to lack knowledge of the Christian view of theology. The Freedom From Religion Foundation was co-founded by Anne Nicol Gaylor and her daughter, Annie Laurie Gaylor, in 1976 in the United States, and incorporated nationally in 1978. It promotes the separation of church and state.

Since the fall of the Berlin Wall, the number of actively anti-religious regimes has declined considerably. In 2006, Timothy Shah of the Pew Forum noted "a worldwide trend across all major religious groups, in which God-based and faith-based movements in general are experiencing increasing confidence and influence vis-à-vis secular movements and ideologies."
However, Gregory S. Paul and Phil Zuckerman consider this a myth and suggest that the actual situation is much more complex and nuanced.

A 2010 survey found that those identifying themselves as atheists or agnostics are on average more knowledgeable about religion than followers of major faiths. Nonbelievers scored better on questions about tenets central to Protestant and Catholic faiths. Only those of the Mormon and Jewish faiths scored as well as atheists and agnostics.

In 2012, the first "Women in Secularism" conference was held in Arlington, Virginia. Secular Woman was organized in 2012 as a national organization focused on nonreligious women. The atheist feminist movement has also become increasingly focused on fighting sexism and sexual harassment within the atheist movement itself.
In August 2012, Jennifer McCreight (the organizer of Boobquake) founded a movement within atheism known as Atheism Plus, or A+, that "applies skepticism to everything, including social issues like sexism, racism, politics, poverty, and crime".

In 2013 the first atheist monument on American government property was unveiled at the Bradford County Courthouse in Florida: a 1,500-pound granite bench and plinth inscribed with quotes by Thomas Jefferson, Benjamin Franklin, and Madalyn Murray O'Hair.

New Atheism 

"New Atheism" is a movement among some early-21st-century atheist writers who have advocated the view that "religion should not be tolerated but should be countered, criticized, and exposed by rational argument wherever its influence arises."
The movement is commonly associated with Sam Harris, Daniel Dennett, Richard Dawkins, Victor J. Stenger, Christopher Hitchens, and to some extent Ayaan Hirsi Ali. Several best-selling books by these authors, published between 2004 and 2007, form the basis for much of the discussion of "New" Atheism. In best-selling books, the religiously-motivated terrorist events of 9/11 and the partially successful attempts of the Discovery Institute to change the American science curriculum to include creationist ideas, together with support for those ideas from George W. Bush in 2005, have been cited by authors such as Harris, Dennett, Dawkins, Stenger, and Hitchens as evidence of a need to move toward a more secular society.

Demographics 

It is difficult to quantify the number of atheists in the world. Respondents to religious-belief polls may define "atheism" differently or draw different distinctions between atheism, non-religious beliefs, and non-theistic religious and spiritual beliefs. A Hindu atheist would declare oneself as a Hindu, although also being an atheist at the same time. Most of the time this happens because atheism and irreligion are not officially recognised in India. Apostasy is allowed under the right to freedom of religion in the Constitution (but blasphemy is prohibited), there are no specific laws catering to atheists and they are considered as belonging to the religion of their birth for administrative purposes. A 2010 survey published in Encyclopædia Britannica found that the non-religious made up about 9.6% of the world's population, and atheists about 2.0%, with a very large majority based in Asia. This figure did not include those who follow atheistic religions, such as some Buddhists. The average annual change for atheism from 2000 to 2010 was −0.17%. Broad estimates of those who have an absence of belief in a god range from 500 million to 1.1 billion people worldwide. Scholars have indicated that global atheism may be in decline as a percentage of the global population due to irreligious countries having the lowest birth rates in the world and religious countries generally having higher birth rates.

According to global Win-Gallup International studies, 13% of respondents were "convinced atheists" in 2012, 11% were "convinced atheists" in 2015, and in 2017, 9% were "convinced atheists". , the top 10 surveyed countries with people who viewed themselves as "convinced atheists" were China (47%), Japan (31%), the Czech Republic (30%), France (29%), South Korea (15%), Germany (15%), Netherlands (14%), Austria (10%), Iceland (10%), Australia (10%), and the Republic of Ireland (10%). A 2012 study by the NORC found that East Germany had the highest percentage of atheists while Czech Republic had the second highest amount.

The number of atheists per country is strongly correlated with the level of security for both the individual and society, with some exceptions.

Europe 

According to the 2010 Eurobarometer Poll, the percentage of those polled who agreed with the statement "you don't believe there is any sort of spirit, God or life force" varied from a high percentage in France (40%), Czech Republic (37%), Sweden (34%), Netherlands (30%), and Estonia (29%); medium-high percentage in Germany (27%), Belgium (27%), UK (25%); to very low in Poland (5%), Greece (4%), Cyprus (3%), Malta (2%), and Romania (1%), with the European Union as a whole at 20%. In a 2012 Eurobarometer poll on discrimination in the European Union, 16% of those polled considered themselves non-believers/agnostics, and 7% considered themselves atheists.

According to a Pew Research Center survey in 2012, about 18% of Europeans are religiously unaffiliated, including agnostics and atheists. According to the same survey, the religiously unaffiliated are the majority of the population only in two European countries: Czech Republic (75%) and Estonia (60%).

Asia 
There are another three countries, and one special administrative region of China or regions where the unaffiliated make up a majority of the population: North Korea (71%), Japan (57%), Hong Kong (56%), and China (52%).

Australasia 
According to the Australian Bureau of Statistics, 30% of Australians have "no religion", a category that includes atheists.

In a 2013 census, 42% of New Zealanders reported having no religion, up from 30% in 1991.

United States 
According to the World Values Survey, 4.4% of Americans self-identified as atheists in 2014. However, the same survey showed that 11.1% of all respondents stated "no" when asked if they believed in God. In 1984, these same figures were 1.1% and 2.2%, respectively. According to a 2014 report by the Pew Research Center, 3.1% of the US adult population identify as atheist, up from 1.6% in 2007; and within the religiously unaffiliated (or "no religion") demographic, atheists made up 13.6%. According to the 2015 General Sociological Survey the number of atheists and agnostics in the US has remained relatively flat in the past 23 years since in 1991 only 2% identified as atheist and 4% identified as agnostic and in 2014 only 3% identified as atheists and 5% identified as agnostics.

According to the American Family Survey, 34% were found to be religiously unaffiliated in 2017 (23% 'nothing in particular', 6% agnostic, 5% atheist). According to the Pew Research Center, in 2014, 22.8% of the American population does not identify with a religion, including atheists (3.1%) and agnostics (4%). According to a PRRI survey, 24% of the population is unaffiliated. Atheists and agnostics combined make up about a quarter of this unaffiliated demographic.

Arab world 
In recent years, the profile of atheism has risen substantially in the Arab world. In major cities across the region, such as Cairo, atheists have been organizing in cafés and social media, despite regular crackdowns from authoritarian governments. A 2012 poll by Gallup International revealed that 5% of Saudis considered themselves to be "convinced atheists". However, very few young people in the Arab world have atheists in their circle of friends or acquaintances. According to one study, less than 1% did in Morocco, Egypt, Saudi Arabia, or Jordan; only 3% to 7% in the United Arab Emirates, Bahrain, Kuwait, and Palestine. When asked whether they have "seen or heard traces of atheism in [their] locality, community, and society" only about 3% to 8% responded yes in all the countries surveyed. The only exception was the UAE, with a percentage of 51%.

Wealth, education, and reasoning style 
Various studies have reported positive correlations between levels of education, wealth and IQ with atheism. In a 2008 study, researchers found intelligence to be negatively related to religious belief in Europe and the United States. In a sample of 137 countries, the correlation between national IQ and disbelief in God was found to be 0.60. According to evolutionary psychologist Nigel Barber, atheism blossoms in places where most people feel economically secure, particularly in the social democracies of Europe, as there is less uncertainty about the future with extensive social safety nets and better health care resulting in a greater quality of life and higher life expectancy. By contrast, in underdeveloped countries, there are far fewer atheists.

The relationship between atheism and IQ, while statistically significant, is not a large one, and the reason for the relationship is not well understood. One hypothesis is that the negative relationship between IQ and religiosity is mediated by individual differences in nonconformity; in many countries, religious belief is a conformist choice, and there is evidence that more intelligent people are less likely to conform. Another theory is that people of higher IQ are more likely to engage in analytical reasoning, and that disbelief in religion results from the application of higher-level analytical reasoning to the assessment of religious claims.

In a 2017 study, it was shown that compared to religious individuals, atheists have higher reasoning capacities and this difference seemed to be unrelated to sociodemographic factors such as age, education and country of origin. In a 2015 study, researchers found that atheists score higher on cognitive reflection tests than theists, the authors wrote that "The fact that atheists score higher agrees with the literature showing that belief is an automatic manifestation of the mind and its default mode. Disbelieving seems to require deliberative cognitive ability." A 2016 study, in which 4 new studies were reported and a meta-analysis of all previous research on the topic was performed, found that self-identified atheists scored 18.7% higher than theists on the cognitive reflection test and there is a negative correlation between religiosity and analytical thinking. The authors note that recently "it has been argued that analytic thinkers are not actually less religious; rather, the putative association may be a result of religiosity typically being measured after analytic thinking (an order effect)," however, they state "Our results indicate that the association between analytical thinking and religious disbelief is not caused by a simple order effect. There is good evidence that atheists and agnostics are more reflective than religious believers." This "analytic atheist" effect has also been found among academic philosophers, even when controlling for about a dozen potential confounds such as education.

However, some studies do not detect this correlation between atheism and analytic thinking in all of the countries that they study, suggesting that the relationship between analytic thinking and atheism may depend on culture. There is also evidence that gender may be involved in the so-called analytic atheist effect: because men have been found more likely to endorse atheism, and men often perform slightly better on tests of analytic thinking when not controlling for variables such as math anxiety, the correlation between atheism and analytic reasoning may be partly explained by whatever explains observed gender differences in analytic thinking.

Attitudes toward atheism 

Statistically, atheists are held in poor regard across the globe. Non-atheists, and possibly even fellow atheists, seem to implicitly view atheists as prone to exhibit immoral behaviors ranging from mass murder to not paying at a restaurant. In addition, according to a 2016 Pew Research Center publication, 15% of French people, 45% of Americans, and 99% of Indonesians explicitly believe that a person must believe in God to be moral. Pew furthermore noted that, in a U.S. poll, atheists and Muslims tied for the lowest rating among the major religious demographics on a "feeling thermometer". Also, a study of religious college students found that they were more likely to perceive and interact with atheists negatively after considering their mortality, suggesting that these attitudes may be the result of death anxiety.

See also 

 Antireligion
 Apatheism
 A Rough History of Disbelief
 Brights movement
 Lists of atheists
 National Day of Reason
 Outline of atheism

Notes

References

Citations

Sources 

 
 
 
 
 
 
 
 
 
 
 
 
  alternate URL

Further reading 

 
 Bradlaugh, Charles, Annie Besant and others. (1884) The Atheistic Platform: 12 Lectures. London: Freethought Publishing. 
 
 
 
 
 
 
 
 

 
 Howson, Colin (2011). Objecting to God. Cambridge: Cambridge University Press. 
 Inglehart, Ronald F., "Giving Up on God: The Global Decline of Religion", Foreign Affairs, vol. 99, no. 5 (September / October 2020), pp. 110–118. 
 
 
 
 
 
 
 
 
 
 
 
 
 
 
 
 
 Rosenberg, Alex (2011). The Atheist's Guide to Reality: Enjoying Life Without Illusions. New York: W.W. Norton & Co. 
 
 
 
 Smolkin, Victoria. A Sacred Space is Never Empty: A History of Soviet Atheism (Princeton UP, 2018) online reviews
 
 Walters, Kerry (2010). Atheism: A Guide for the Perplexed. New York: Continuum. 
 Whitmarsh, Tim. (2015), Battling the Gods: Atheism in the Ancient World

External links 

 
 
 
 
 The New Atheists. Internet Encyclopedia of Philosophy
 . Includes links to organizations and websites.
 Religion & Ethics—Atheism at bbc.co.uk.
 Secular Web library. Library of both historical and modern writings, a comprehensive online resource for freely available material on atheism.
 Is Agnosticism Just Timid Atheism? A Dialogue by Ted Cadsby 2017, HuffPost

 
Criticism of religion
Irreligion
Philosophy of religion
Skepticism